Clapper Hollow Creek is a river in Schoharie County, New York. It flows into Charlotte Creek southwest of Charlotteville. Part of the creek flows through the  Clapper Hollow State Forest, which was purchased by the state in the 1930s.

Fishing
Clapper Hollow Creek is a classified trout stream.

References

Rivers of New York (state)
Rivers of Schoharie County, New York